Rossön is a locality situated in Strömsund Municipality, Jämtland County, Sweden with 352 inhabitants in 2010.

References 

Populated places in Strömsund Municipality
Ångermanland